Sphinx ligustri, the privet hawk moth, is a moth found in most of the Palearctic realm. The species was first described by Carl Linnaeus in his 1758 10th edition of Systema Naturae.

Description
It has a  wingspan (generally deflexed at rest), and is found in urban areas, forests and woodlands.

The male privet hawk moth can make a hissing sound, if disturbed, by rubbing together a set of scales and spines at the end of its abdomen.

The larvae are usually found between July and August: and bury themselves in the earth when preparing to become a pupa. They then fly in the following June.

Diet
As its name describes, the caterpillars feed on privets, as well as ash trees, lilacs, jasmine, and a number of other plants.

Gallery

References

External links
 
 
 "69.006 BF1976 Privet Hawk-moth Sphinx ligustri Linnaeus, 1758". UKMoths. Retrieved December 13, 2018.
 
 "06832 Sphinx ligustri Linnaeus, 1758 - Ligusterschwärmer". Lepiforum e.V. Retrieved December 13, 2018.

Sphinx (genus)
Moths described in 1758
Moths of Australia
Moths of Europe
Moths of Japan
Moths of Asia
Taxa named by Carl Linnaeus